In abstract algebra and analysis, the Archimedean property, named after the ancient Greek mathematician Archimedes of Syracuse, is a property held by some algebraic structures, such as ordered or normed groups, and fields. 
It also means that the set of natural numbers is not bounded above. Roughly speaking, it is the property of having no infinitely large or infinitely small elements. 
It was Otto Stolz who gave the axiom of Archimedes its name because it appears as Axiom V of Archimedes’ On the Sphere and Cylinder.

The notion arose from the theory of magnitudes of Ancient Greece; it still plays an important role in modern mathematics such as David Hilbert's axioms for geometry, and the theories of ordered groups, ordered fields, and local fields.

An algebraic structure in which any two non-zero elements are comparable, in the sense that neither of them is infinitesimal with respect to the other, is said to be Archimedean. 
A structure which has a pair of non-zero elements, one of which is infinitesimal with respect to the other, is said to be non-Archimedean. 
For example, a linearly ordered group that is Archimedean is an Archimedean group.

This can be made precise in various contexts with slightly different formulations. 
For example, in the context of ordered fields, one has the axiom of Archimedes which formulates this property, where the field of real numbers is Archimedean, but that of rational functions in real coefficients is not.

History and origin of the name of the Archimedean property 

The concept was named by Otto Stolz (in the 1880s) after the ancient Greek geometer and physicist Archimedes of Syracuse.

The Archimedean property appears in Book V of Euclid's Elements as Definition 4:

Because Archimedes credited it to Eudoxus of Cnidus it is also known as the "Theorem of Eudoxus" or the Eudoxus axiom.

Archimedes used infinitesimals in heuristic arguments, although he denied that those were finished mathematical proofs.

Definition for linearly ordered groups 

Let  and  be positive elements of a linearly ordered group G. 

This definition can be extended to the entire group by taking absolute values.

The algebraic structure  is Archimedean if it has no infinite elements and no infinitesimal elements.

Ordered fields 

Ordered fields have some additional properties:
 The rational numbers are embedded in any ordered field. That is, any ordered field has characteristic zero.
 If  is infinitesimal, then  is infinite, and vice versa. Therefore, to verify that a field is Archimedean it is enough to check only that there are no infinitesimal elements, or to check that there are no infinite elements.
In this setting, an ordered field  is Archimedean precisely when the following statement, called the axiom of Archimedes, holds:
Then there exists a natural number  such that ."
Alternatively one can use the following characterization:

Definition for normed fields 

The qualifier "Archimedean" is also formulated in the theory of rank one valued fields and normed spaces over rank one valued fields as follows. 
Let  be a field endowed with an absolute value function, i.e., a function which associates the real number  with the field element 0 and associates a positive real number  with each non-zero  and satisfies
Then,  is said to be Archimedean if for any non-zero  there exists a natural number  such that

Similarly, a normed space is Archimedean if a sum of  terms, each equal to a non-zero vector , has norm greater than one for sufficiently large . 
A field with an absolute value or a normed space is either Archimedean or satisfies the stronger condition, referred to as the ultrametric triangle inequality,

respectively. 
A field or normed space satisfying the ultrametric triangle inequality is called non-Archimedean.

The concept of a non-Archimedean normed linear space was introduced by A. F. Monna.

Examples and non-examples

Archimedean property of the real numbers 

The field of the rational numbers can be assigned one of a number of absolute value functions, including the trivial function , when , the more usual , and the -adic absolute value functions. 
By Ostrowski's theorem, every non-trivial absolute value on the rational numbers is equivalent to either the usual absolute value or some -adic absolute value. 
The rational field is not complete with respect to non-trivial absolute values; with respect to the trivial absolute value, the rational field is a discrete topological space, so complete. 
The completion with respect to the usual absolute value (from the order) is the field of real numbers. 
By this construction the field of real numbers is Archimedean both as an ordered field and as a normed field. 
On the other hand, the completions with respect to the other non-trivial absolute values give the fields of p-adic numbers, where  is a prime integer number (see below); since the -adic absolute values satisfy the ultrametric property, then the -adic number fields are non-Archimedean as normed fields (they cannot be made into ordered fields).

In the axiomatic theory of real numbers, the non-existence of nonzero infinitesimal real numbers is implied by the least upper bound property as follows. 
Denote by  the set consisting of all positive infinitesimals. 
Now assume for a contradiction that  is nonempty. 
Then it has a least upper bound , which is also positive, so . 
But , so  is not infinitesimal, and this is a contradiction. 
This means that  is empty after all: there are no positive, infinitesimal real numbers.

The Archimedean property of real numbers holds also in constructive analysis, even though the least upper bound property may fail in that context.

Non-Archimedean ordered field 

For an example of an ordered field that is not Archimedean, take the field of rational functions with real coefficients. 
(A rational function is any function that can be expressed as one polynomial divided by another polynomial; we will assume in what follows that this has been done in such a way that the leading coefficient of the denominator is positive.) 
To make this an ordered field, one must assign an ordering compatible with the addition and multiplication operations. 
Now  if and only if , so we only have to say which rational functions are considered positive. 
Call the function positive if the leading coefficient of the numerator is positive. (One must check that this ordering is well defined and compatible with addition and multiplication.) 
By this definition, the rational function  is positive but less than the rational function . 
Therefore,  is an infinitesimal in this field.

This example generalizes to other coefficients. 
Taking rational functions with rational instead of real coefficients produces a countable non-Archimedean ordered field. 
Taking the coefficients to be the rational functions in a different variable, say , produces an example with a different order type.

Non-Archimedean valued fields 

The field of the rational numbers endowed with the p-adic metric and the  p-adic number fields which are the completions, do not have the Archimedean property as fields with absolute values.  
All Archimedean valued fields are isometrically isomorphic to a subfield of the complex numbers with a power of the usual absolute value.

Equivalent definitions of Archimedean ordered field 

The following are equivalent characterizations of Archimedean fields in terms of these substructures.

(This is not the case when there exist infinite elements.) Thus an Archimedean field is one whose natural numbers grow without bound.
(If  contained a positive infinitesimal it would be a lower bound for the set whence zero would not be the greatest lower bound.)
This is because the set consists of all the infinitesimals, which is just the set  when there are no nonzero infinitesimals, and otherwise is open, there being neither a least nor greatest nonzero infinitesimal. Observe that in both cases, the set of infinitesimals is closed. In the latter case, (i) every infinitesimal is less than every positive rational, (ii) there is neither a greatest infinitesimal nor a least positive rational, and (iii) there is nothing else in between. Consequently, any non-Archimedean ordered field is both incomplete and disconnected.
 For any  in  the set of integers greater than  has a least element. (If  were a negative infinite quantity every integer would be greater than it.)
 Every nonempty open interval of  contains a rational. (If  is a positive infinitesimal, the open interval  contains infinitely many infinitesimals but not a single rational.)
Thus an Archimedean field is any dense ordered extension of the rationals, in the sense of any ordered field that densely embeds its rational elements.

See also

Notes

References 

 

Field (mathematics)
Ordered groups
Real algebraic geometry